P105 may refer to:
 , a patrol boat of the Mexican Navy
 
 NFKB1, nuclear factor NF-kappa-B p105 subunit
 Papyrus 105, a biblical manuscript
 P105, a Latvian State first class road